Bédarrides (Provençal: Bedarrida) is a commune in the Vaucluse department in the Provence-Alpes-Côte d'Azur region in southeastern France.

Name 
The settlement is attested as villa Betorrida in 814, Biturrita in 898, Bisturrita in 903, Beddurida in 908, and Bederrida in 1274.

Population

See also
Communes of the Vaucluse department

References

Bibliography 

 

Communes of Vaucluse